Acrossocheilus aluoiensis is a species of cyprinid fish. It is known with certainty only from the Kong River (Mekong River basin) in Vietnam, but similar specimens have also been caught in Laos. It grows to  total length.

References

aluoiensis
Fish of Vietnam
Fish of the Mekong Basin
Taxa named by Nguyễn Hữu Dực
Fish described in 1997